Ron Spears is a former defensive end in the National Football League. He first played with the New England Patriots during the 1982 NFL season before splitting the following season between the Patriots and the Green Bay Packers.

References

Players of American football from Los Angeles
New England Patriots players
Green Bay Packers players
American football defensive ends
San Diego State Aztecs football players
1959 births
Living people